Interrogation is an American true crime drama television series, created by Anders Weidemann and John Mankiewicz, that premiered on CBS All Access on February 6, 2020. In November 2020, the series was canceled after one season. The season was inspired by the Bruce Lisker conviction for the murder of his mother, when he was age 17.

Premise
Interrogation is described as "an original concept based on a true story that spanned more than 30 years, in which a young man was charged and convicted of brutally murdering his mother. Each episode is structured around an interrogation taken directly from the real police case files, with the goal of turning the viewer into a detective.  The first nine episodes of the series are available to watch in any order, and the conclusive season finale was released later." All ten episodes have been released.

Cast

Main
 Peter Sarsgaard as Det. David Russell
 Kyle Gallner as Eric Fisher
 David Strathairn as Henry Fisher
 Kodi Smit-McPhee as Chris Keller

Recurring
 Vincent D'Onofrio as Sgt. Ian Lynch
 Joanna Going as Mary Fisher
 Ebon Moss-Bachrach as Trey Carano
 Andre Royo as Charlie Shannon
 Chad Coleman
 Frank Whaley
 Pat Healy
 Melinda McGraw
 Michael Harney
 Vinessa Antoine
Autry Haydon-Wilson

Episodes

Production

Development
On November 12, 2018, it was announced that CBS All Access had given the production a straight-to-series order for first season consisting of ten episodes. The series was created by Anders Weidemann and John Mankiewicz who were also expected to executive produce alongside Henrik Bastin and Melissa Aouate. Production companies involved with the series were slated to consist of Fabrik Entertainment and CBS Television Studios. While the series is based on a real-life criminal case, CBS All Access was not revealing the case in question at the time of the announcement. Furthermore, at that point, scripts for the series featured the real names of the people involved in the case, and it had not been decided yet whether they would be changed. At the time the events originally occurred, the case did not make national news but was reportedly well known to people living in the area where it happened. On December 12, 2019, key art was released, revealing a February 6, 2020 premiere date. In February 2020, it was reported that the show was based on the case of Bruce Lisker. On November 4, 2020, CBS All Access canceled the series after one season. In January 2023, the series was removed from Paramount+.

Casting
In January 2019, it was announced that Peter Sarsgaard and David Strathairn had been cast in starring roles. On February 7, 2019, it was reported that Kodi Smit-McPhee had joined the main cast. On March 11, 2019, it was announced that Frank Whaley had been cast in a recurring role. On March 28, 2019, it was reported that Pat Healy, Melinda McGraw, and Michael Harney has been cast in recurring roles. On April 3, 2019, it was announced that Ebon Moss-Bachrach had been cast in a recurring capacity. On April 8, 2019, it was reported that Vincent D'Onofrio had been cast in a recurring role. On May 8, 2019, it was announced that Vinessa Antoine had joined the cast in a recurring capacity.

Reception
The review aggregator website Rotten Tomatoes reported a 57% approval rating for the series with an average rating of 6.21/10, based on 14 reviews. The website's critical consensus states, "Interrogation's "interactive" qualities are interesting, but ultimately get in the way of what could be a satisfying dramatic experience." On Metacritic, it has a weighted average score of 54 out of 100, based on 8 critics, indicating "mixed or average reviews".

References

External links
 
 

2020 American television series debuts
2020 American television series endings
2020s American crime drama television series
English-language television shows
True crime television series
Paramount+ original programming
Television series by CBS Studios
Interactive television